Favre Bjerg is a mountain in eastern Greenland.
Administratively it is part of the Northeast Greenland National Park.

This peak was named at the time of Lauge Koch’s 1936–38 expedition after Swiss geologist Jean Alphonse Favre (1815–1890). The name was chosen by Heinrich Bütler (1893–1983), another Swiss geologist who worked for many years with Lauge Koch in his East Greenland expeditions.

Geography
It is the highest point of Hudson Land. This mountain is marked as a  peak in the Defense Mapping Agency Greenland Navigation charts.

See also
List of mountains in Greenland

References

External links
Geographical Names

Favre